Sedlec is a cadastral district of Prague, Czech Republic. In 2015 it had 892 inhabitants. 
The German name of Sedlec is Selz.

References 

Districts of Prague